Geoffrey S. Morrell (born November 1968) is currently the President of Global Strategy & Communications at Teneo, a public relations and advisory firm. In 2022 he was the Chief Corporate Affairs Officer at Disney for three months before resigning. He served as the Executive Vice President of Communications and Advocacy at BP from 2011 to 2021. From 2007 to 2011, he was the Deputy Assistant Secretary of Defense for Public Affairs and the Press Secretary for the US Department of Defense.

Early life and education 

Morrell graduated from the Lawrenceville School in 1987, earned a bachelor's degree in 1991 from Georgetown University and a master's degree in journalism in 1992 from Columbia University.

Professional career 

Morrell began his reporting career in 1992 at KATV-TV in Little Rock, Arkansas, covering the presidential campaign of Bill Clinton.  In 1994, he took a job as a reporter at WSET-TV in Lynchburg/Roanoke, and in 1995, Morrell joined KSAZ-TV in Phoenix as a TV news reporter.  In 1996, Morrell joined WBBM-TV in Chicago in the same capacity. While working as for WBBM-TV in Chicago, Morrell appeared in the 1998 movie The Negotiator playing himself as a news reporter. 

Morrell left WBBM-TV in early 2000 and joined ABC News, working in both the network's Chicago and Washington, D.C. bureaus. He was an ABC White House television correspondent for four years.  In 2007, Morrell resigned from ABC after seven years with the network to be appointed the Deputy Assistant Secretary of Defense for Public Affairs where he served under two presidents. Morrell resigned upon Secretary Robert Gates' retirement in July 2011 and was replaced by George E. Little.

In September 2011, Morrell joined BP as a vice-president and the company's head of US communications and in September 2013 became the company's senior vice president of US communications and external affairs. As head of communications and external affairs, Morrell was in charge of government and media relations, internal communications, community affairs and philanthropy in the U.S.

It was reported in 2017 that Morrell would be moving to London to become head of group communications and external affairs, where he is in charge of BP's global government media relations, internal communications and community affairs.

In 2020, Morrell was appointed Executive Vice President of Communications and Advocacy at BP.

In December 2021, it was announced that Morrell would be leaving BP to oversee “communications, government relations, public policy, philanthropy and environmental issues” as Disney's Chief Corporate Affairs Officer. Morrell transitioned into his role with Disney in January 2022. Morrell resigned from Disney on April 29, 2022 stating "for a number of reasons it is not the right fit" and that he would "pursue other opportunities". During his three-month stint at Disney, he was paid over $10 million in compensation for his work. Disney had become embroiled in a dispute with Florida's Governor Ron DeSantis and the Florida laws regarding  parental educational rights and teaching of gender identity.  Prior to Morrell's resignation, Florida had enacted a law requiring the termination of Disney's special self-governing tax and improvement district that governed 25,000 acres of Disney World.

References

External links

United States Department of Defense officials
1968 births
Living people
Columbia University Graduate School of Journalism alumni
Georgetown University alumni
Lawrenceville School alumni
BP people
Place of birth missing (living people)